This is a list of villages in Vestland, a county of Norway (formed on 1 January 2020 with the merging of the counties of Hordaland and Sogn og Fjordane).  The rows highlighted in blue represent the administrative centers of the municipality.

See also
For other counties, see the lists of villages in Norway

References

External links

Vestland